The Samuel R. Murphy House, also known as the Winfield Scott Bird House, is a historic structure in Eutaw, Alabama.  The one-story Greek Revival house was built in the 1850s by Samuel R. Murphy,  in part with materials salvaged from the old Mesopotamia Presbyterian Church.  It was purchased by Winfield Scott Bird in 1869.  The house was placed on the National Register of Historic Places as part of the Antebellum Homes in Eutaw Thematic Resource on April 2, 1982, due to its architectural significance.

References

National Register of Historic Places in Greene County, Alabama
Houses on the National Register of Historic Places in Alabama
Houses in Greene County, Alabama